The Bigelow Block is a historic commercial and residential building at the corner of Forest and Salem Streets in Medford, Massachusetts. The Victorian block was built in 1886 for the locally prominent Bigelow family; it is a four-story brick building with sandstone trim, terra cotta plaques, and copper-clad turret at the corner.  It occupies a prominent position in the center of Medford, and is one of few surviving 19th century commercial buildings in the city.

The building was listed on the National Register of Historic Places in 1975.

See also
National Register of Historic Places listings in Medford, Massachusetts
National Register of Historic Places listings in Middlesex County, Massachusetts

References

Commercial blocks on the National Register of Historic Places in Massachusetts
Buildings and structures in Medford, Massachusetts
National Register of Historic Places in Medford, Massachusetts